Drew Tyler Bell (born January 29, 1986) is an American actor and dancer. He graduated from Barbizon Modeling and Acting School in Akron, Ohio. He also graduated from the David Nazarian College of Business and Economics at California State University, Northridge. He earned an M.B.A. from the Booth School of Business at the University of Chicago.

Career
Bell is perhaps most known for his role as Thomas Forrester in The Bold and the Beautiful, which he held from 2004 until 2010, for which he won the 2010 Daytime Emmy Award for Outstanding Younger Actor in a Drama Series. He has made other television appearances, including the television series Jake 2.0, Standoff, and Desperate Housewives. He was also in the television movie, Love's Abiding Joy. He has also performed in numerous television commercials.

Bell made his feature film debut in Jeepers Creepers II, which was released in August 2003. He also appeared in The Seeker: The Dark is Rising as James Stanton and in Her Best Move as Josh. In addition, he appeared in the independent film State's Evidence (2006).

On stage, Bell appeared as Hanschen in the Broadway show, Spring Awakening, and earlier in regional theatre productions.

Filmography

References

External links

1986 births
Living people
21st-century American male actors
American male child actors
American male dancers
American male film actors
American male musical theatre actors
American male soap opera actors
American male television actors
American tap dancers
Daytime Emmy Award winners
Daytime Emmy Award for Outstanding Younger Actor in a Drama Series winners